The Red Bull RB2 is the car with which the Red Bull Racing team competed in the 2006 Formula One season. The chassis was designed by Mark Smith, Rob Taylor and Ben Agathangelou and the engines were supplied by Ferrari. It was driven by David Coulthard and Christian Klien, who had both driven for the team in its debut year, . However, Klien was replaced after the Italian GP by third driver Robert Doornbos after the Austrian refused the team's offer of a ChampCar seat for 2007 once it became apparent that he was going to be replaced by Mark Webber for the next season.

History 
After the good results of the previous inaugural season, 2006 was a poor season for Red Bull. The year was treated as a consolidation season and proved to be a traditionally tough second year for a new team. The new Ferrari engines caused cooling problems pre-season which saw testing time limited, and for the most part the team were bogged down in the midfield. This situation was exacerbated by RBR abandoning development on the RB2 during the season to let new Chief Technical Officer Adrian Newey concentrate on 2007's challenger.

However, there were still highlights in a largely depressing season. Foremost among these was Coulthard scoring the team's first podium at Monaco. As this coincided with a one-race deal to promote the new Superman film, the veteran driver wore a red cape on the podium, and Team Principal Christian Horner later honoured a pre-race promise of jumping into the team's pool wearing nothing but one of the capes.

The team eventually finished seventh in the Constructors' Championship, with 16 points.

Livery 
The RB2's livery was similar to that of the preceding RB1. At the Monaco Grand Prix, both Red Bull cars had the Superman Returns livery and, for this race the Red Bull pit crew wore white overalls. Among the drivers, Klien wore a blue overall on the day of the race.

Complete Formula One results
(key) (results in bold indicate pole position)

References

Red Bull RB02
2006 Formula One season cars